Edward Reilly Stettinius Jr. (October 22, 1900 – October 31, 1949) was an American businessman who served as United States Secretary of State under Presidents Franklin D. Roosevelt and Harry S. Truman from 1944 to 1945, and as U.S. Ambassador to the United Nations from 1945 to 1946.

Early life and education
Stettinius was born in Chicago, Illinois, on October 22, 1900, the younger of two sons and third of four children of Edward R. Stettinius and Judith Carrington. His mother was a Virginian of colonial English ancestry. His father was of German descent and was a native of St. Louis, Missouri.

The younger Stettinius grew up in a mansion on the family's estate on Staten Island and graduated from the Pomfret School in 1920, after which he attended the University of Virginia until 1924. He finished very few courses and never took a degree. Instead he spent his time on charitable outreach to poor families. He became a member of the secret Seven Society.

Career
In 1926, Stettinius began working at General Motors as a stock clerk, but his connections made for rapid advancement. He became assistant to John Lee Pratt, a friend of the family, and by 1931 he had become vice president of public and industrial relations. At General Motors, he worked to develop unemployment relief programs and came into contact with New York Governor Franklin Roosevelt.

In the 1930s, Stettinius's work in the private sector alternated with public service. He served on the Industrial Advisory Board of the National Recovery Administration (1933). In 1934 he returned to the private sector when he joined U.S. Steel, the nation's largest corporation; he eventually become chairman in 1938.

He then returned to public service, serving on the National Defense Advisory Commission, as chairman of the War Resources Board (1939) and administrator of the Lend-Lease Program (1941). He held the latter position until he became undersecretary of state in 1943. In January 1944, Macmillan published his book, Lend-Lease, Weapon for Victory.

The poor health of Secretary of State Cordell Hull made Stettinius the chair of the 1944 Dumbarton Oaks Conference and, in December 1944, he succeeded Hull as Secretary of State. Stettinius was a member of the US delegation to the February 1945 Yalta Conference.

Truman thought Stettinius was too soft on communism, and had yielded too much to Moscow when he was Roosevelt's advisor at Yalta. Truman had an old Senate friend in mind as a replacement, James F. Byrnes. Stettinius resigned as Secretary of State to accept the position of the first United States Ambassador to the United Nations. He chaired the United States delegation to the United Nations Conference on International Organization held in San Francisco from April 25 to June 26, 1945, which brought together delegates from 50 Allied nations to create the United Nations. Charles W. Yost, who had been Under Secretary of State Stettinius' assistant in the State Department, was named Stettinius' Executive Secretary at the United Nations Conference.  

Stettinius resigned in June 1946, as he became critical of what he saw as Truman's refusal to use the UN as a tool to resolve tensions with the Soviet Union. For three years after his return to private life, Stettinius served as rector of the University of Virginia. In 1947, Stettinius and friend William Tubman, the president of Liberia, helped form the Liberia Company (now International Registries), a partnership between the Liberian government and American financiers to provide funds for the development of the African nation.

Personal life 
On May 15, 1926, Stettinius married Virginia Gordon Wallace, daughter of a prominent family of Richmond, Virginia. They had three children: Edward Reilly III and twins Wallace and Joseph.

During his retirement, Stettinius lived at his Virginia estate, The Horseshoe, on the Rapidan River. He died of a coronary thrombosis on October 31, 1949, at the home of a sister in Greenwich, Connecticut, at the age of 49, and was buried in the family plot in Locust Valley Cemetery, Locust Valley, New York.

Archive
Stettinius's voluminous archive of more than 1,000 boxes resides at the Albert and Shirley Small Special Collections Library at the University of Virginia.

Notes

References

Further reading
 Devine, Michael J.  and Nathan Giles. "Stettinius, Edward Reilly, Jr."; American National Biography Online 2000; Access Date: Jun 06 2017 
 "Edward Reilly Stettinius". Dictionary of American Biography, Supplement 4: 1946-1950. American Council of Learned Societies, 1974.
 Hopkins, Michael F. "President Harry Truman's Secretaries of State: Stettinius, Byrnes, Marshall and Acheson." Journal of Transatlantic Studies 6.3 (2008): 290-304.
 Johnson, Walter. "Edward R. Stettinius, Jr.," in An Uncertain Tradition: American Secretaries of State in the Twentieth Century, ed. Norman A. Grabner (1961). 
 Walker, Richard L. "E. R. Stettinius, Jr.," in The American Secretaries of State and Their Diplomacy, vol. 14, (1965) online

Primary sources
 Edward Stettinius, Roosevelt and the Russians (New York, 1950) his memoirs of the Yalta Conference
 The Diaries of Edward R. Stettinius, Jr., 1943-1946, ed. Thomas M. Campbell and George C. Herring (New Viewpoints, 1975), ISBN 0531055701

External links
 
 Time cover
 Edward Stettinius, Eleanor Roosevelt National Historic Site

|-

|-

|-

1900 births
1949 deaths
20th-century American politicians
American Episcopalians
American people of German descent
Deaths from coronary thrombosis
Franklin D. Roosevelt administration cabinet members
General Motors former executives
National Recovery Administration
People from Staten Island
Permanent Representatives of the United States to the United Nations
Politicians from Chicago
Truman administration cabinet members
United States Secretaries of State
United States Under Secretaries of State
University of Virginia alumni
World War II political leaders
Pomfret School alumni